Megachile turneri is a species of bee in the family Megachilidae. It was described by Meade-Waldo in 1913.

References

Turneri
Insects described in 1913
Taxa named by Edmund Meade-Waldo